The men's sprint competition of the Biathlon World Championships 2011 were held on March 5, 2011 at 14:00 local time.

Results

References

Biathlon World Championships 2011